Zarak is a 1957 CinemaScope adventure film based on the 1949 book The Story of Zarak Khan by A.J. Bevan. It was directed by Terence Young with assistance from John Gilling and Yakima Canutt. Set in the Northwest Frontier (though filmed in Morocco), the film stars Victor Mature, Michael Wilding and Anita Ekberg and features Patrick McGoohan in a supporting role.

Plot
Zarak Khan is the son of a chief who is caught embracing one of his father's wives, Salma. Zarak's father sentences both to torture and death but they are saved by an imam. The exiled Zarak becomes a bandit chief and an enemy of the British Empire.

Cast
 Victor Mature as Zarak Khan
 Michael Wilding as Maj. Michael Ingram
 Anita Ekberg as Salma
 Bonar Colleano as Biri (Zarak's brother)
 Eunice Gayson as Cathy Ingram
 Finlay Currie as The Mullah
 Peter Illing as Ahmad
 Bernard Miles as Hassu the one-eyed
 Eddie Byrne as Kasim – Zarak's brother
 Patrick McGoohan as Moor Larkin
 Frederick Valk as Haji Khan (Zarak's father)
 André Morell as Maj. Atherton
 Harold Goodwin as Sgt. Higgins
 Alec Mango as Akbar (merchant)
 Oscar Quitak as Youssuff

Development
The film is based on a 1950 book written by A. J. Bevan that contained a foreword by field marshal William Slim. According to Bevan, the real Zarak Khan was an Afghan who spent most of his life fighting the British in the northwest frontier in the 1920s and 1930s. Among his crimes was the murder of a holy man. He eventually surrendered and was sentenced to life imprisonment in the Andaman Islands. However, when the Japanese occupied the islands, he remained in his cell.

Khan was eventually dealt a suspended sentence and worked for the British in Burma. In 1943 he was leading a patrol when its British officer was killed in an ambush. He watched another British patrol attacked by the Japanese and sent messengers to summon a Gurkha force. To stop the Japanese from escaping with their prisoners before the Gurkhas arrived, he attacked them singlehandedly and killed or wounded six soldiers before being overpowered. He refused to be beheaded and insisted on being flayed alive to buy time to enable the Gurkhas to arrive.

Warwick Films bought the film rights in 1953. Producer Irving Allen said he was more interested in the character of Zarak Khan than in the events described in the book. He was contemplating changing Khan's nationality in order to offer the role to Errol Flynn, but he eventually decided to make the film a fictional account set in the 19th century. Regular Warwick writer Richard Maibaum wrote the script.

Production
Filming begin Morocco on 1 November 1955 with Yakima Canutt in charge of the second unit. Victor Mature, under a two-picture deal with Warwick, joined the production on 19 November.

Ted Moore, who handled some of the Technicolor/CinemaScope photography, later performed similar work on the early James Bond films, and art director John Box and costume designer Phyllis Dalton later won Oscars for their work on Doctor Zhivago. Richard Maibaum, who adapted A. J. Bevan's novel, went on to adapt such Ian Fleming novels as Dr. No, From Russia, with Love and Goldfinger. Director Terence Young and coproducer Albert R. Broccoli went on to perform the same roles for the early Bond films.

Stuntman Bob Simmons, who performed and doubled several stars in the film, noted that Mature refused to ride a horse. When his stunt double Jack Keely was killed in a horse accident on the set, Mature insisted on personally paying for his funeral.

The popular chanteuse Yana sang her hit song "Climb Up the Wall" in the film.

Studio work took place at Elstree Studios.

Release
The original film poster was criticised by the House of Lords for "bordering on the obscene" and was banned in the United Kingdom.

Legacy
The action sequences reappeared in John Gilling's The Bandit of Zhobe (1958) and The Brigand of Kandahar (1965). The film was remade in India as Zarak Khan (1963), starring Paidi Jairaj and Chitra.

Soundtrack
 "Climb Up the Wall"
 Music by Auyar Hosseini
 Lyrics by Norman Gimbel
 Sung by Yana

See also
List of American films of 1956

References

External links
 
 
 
 

1956 films
American adventure drama films
British adventure drama films
1950s English-language films
Films based on British novels
Films directed by Terence Young
Columbia Pictures films
Films set in the British Raj
1950s romance films
Films with screenplays by Richard Maibaum
Films scored by William Alwyn
Films set in Afghanistan
Films shot in Morocco
Films shot at MGM-British Studios
1950s American films
1950s British films